is a Japanese football player. He plays for Vonds Ichihara.

Playing career
Tetsuya Koishi played for J3 League club; Gainare Tottori from 2014 to 2015. In 2016, he moved to Vonds Ichihara.

Club statistics
Updated to 20 February 2016.

References

External links

1990 births
Living people
University of Teacher Education Fukuoka alumni
Association football people from Hyōgo Prefecture
Japanese footballers
J3 League players
Gainare Tottori players
Vonds Ichihara players
Association football midfielders